Thomas Maurice Adams (born January 15, 1980) is an American professional basketball player who last played for Asseco Prokom Gdynia in Poland.

The 1.91 m guard played for Hampton University in the US and came to TBB Trier in 2006 via stations in Sweden and Israel (Ironi Ramat Gan). Adams switched to the Eisbären Bremerhaven for the 2007/08 season, but his contract was terminated in November 2007. Adams then moved to Poland to Atlas Stal Ostrow.

Awards 
 MEAC Player of the Year (2002)

References

1980 births
Living people
08 Stockholm Human Rights players
American expatriate basketball people in the Dominican Republic
American expatriate basketball people in France
American expatriate basketball people in Germany
American expatriate basketball people in Israel
American expatriate basketball people in Italy
American expatriate basketball people in Poland
American expatriate basketball people in Sweden
American expatriate basketball people in Venezuela
American men's basketball players
Asseco Gdynia players
Basketball players from New York (state)
Cocodrilos de Caracas players
Eisbären Bremerhaven players
Hampton Pirates men's basketball players
Idaho Stampede (CBA) players
Ironi Ramat Gan players
KK Włocławek players
Limoges CSP players
Polonia Warszawa (basketball) players
Scafati Basket players
Shooting guards
Stal Ostrów Wielkopolski players
Yakima Sun Kings players